MacDonald George Becket (November 2, 1928 - December 7, 2017) was an American architect. He was the president, and later chairman and CEO of Welton Becket and Associates, an architectural firm in Los Angeles, California. He helped master plan Century City and restore the California State Capitol. He was made a fellow of the American Institute of Architects in 1974.

References

1928 births
2017 deaths
University of Southern California alumni
Architects from Los Angeles
Fellows of the American Institute of Architects
20th-century American architects
21st-century American architects